Warren D. Leary, Sr. (December 3, 1891 – May 19, 1959) was an American politician and newspaper editor.

Born in Elmira, New York, Leary served in the United States Army during World War I and World War II and was the inspector general of the 32nd Division. He received his bachelor's degree from Columbia University School of Journalism, where he was a member of Sigma Chi, and also attended the University of Grenoble. Leary worked for the New York Herald and the New York Tribune. He was also editor of Le Digesteur in Quebec and the Chippewa Falls Gazette. He was part owner, publisher, and manager of the Rice Lake Chronotype in Rice Lake, Wisconsin. In 1933, Leary served in the Wisconsin State Assembly and was a Democrat. He died in Rice Lake, Wisconsin in 1959.

Notes

1891 births
1959 deaths
Politicians from Elmira, New York
People from Rice Lake, Wisconsin
Columbia University Graduate School of Journalism alumni
Grenoble Alpes University alumni
Military personnel from Wisconsin
Editors of Wisconsin newspapers
Democratic Party members of the Wisconsin State Assembly
20th-century American politicians
Journalists from New York (state)
20th-century American journalists
American male journalists